Adding controlled noise from predetermined distributions is a way of designing differentially private mechanisms. This technique is useful for designing private mechanisms for real-valued functions on sensitive data. Some commonly used distributions for adding noise include Laplace and Gaussian distributions.

Definitions 
Let  be a collection of all datasets and  be a real-valued function. The sensitivity  of a function, denoted , is defined by

 

For functions with higher dimensions, the sensitivity is usually measured under  or  norms.

Throughout this article,  is used to denote a randomized algorithm that releases a sensitive function  under the - (or -) differential privacy.

Mechanisms for Real-Valued Functions

Laplace Mechanism 
Introduced by Dwork et al., this mechanism adds noise drawn from a Laplace distribution:

 

Roughly speaking, a small-scale noise should suffice for a weak privacy constraint (corresponding to a large value of ), while a greater level of noise would provide a greater degree of uncertainty in what was the original input (corresponding to a small value of ).

The first inequality follows from the triangle inequality and the second from the sensitivity bound.

A discrete variant of the Laplace mechanism, called the geometric mechanism, is universally utility-maximizing. It means that for any prior (such as auxiliary information or beliefs about data distributions) and any symmetric and monotone univariate loss function, the expected loss of any differentially private mechanism can be matched or improved by running the geometric mechanism followed by a data-independent post-processing transformation. The result also holds for minimax (risk-averse) consumers. No such universal mechanism exists for multi-variate loss functions.

Gaussian Mechanism 
Analogous to Laplace mechanism, Gaussian mechanism adds noise drawn from a Gaussian distribution whose variance is calibrated according to the sensitivity and privacy parameters.

provides -differential privacy.

The proof is a little more involved (see Appendix A in Dwork and Roth).

Mechanisms for High Dimensional Functions 
The equivalent Gaussian mechanism that satisfies -differential privacy for such function (still under the assumption that ) is

where  represents the sensitivity of  under  norm and  represents a -dimensional vector, where each coordinate is a noise sampled according to  independent of the other coordinates (see Appendix A in Dwork and Roth for proof).

References 

Differential privacy
Information privacy